Percy Paul Mockler (born April 14, 1949 in St. Leonard, New Brunswick) is a Canadian politician serving as a Canadian Senator from New Brunswick since 2009. A member of the Conservative Party of Canada, Mockler previously served two non-consecutive stints in the Legislative Assembly of New Brunswick from 1982 to 1987, and again from 1993 to 2008.

Biography
He studied at the University of Moncton where he earned a Bachelor of Arts in Political Science and Sociology and a Master of Business Administration degree. A member of the Progressive Conservative Party, was first elected to the Legislative Assembly of New Brunswick in the 1982 election.

After his election defeat in 1987, Mockler worked as an organizer for the federal Progressive Conservatives in the 1988 federal election and worked for the Brian Mulroney administration in Ottawa until its dying days in 1993.

Upon his return to New Brunswick, Mockler was able to run again to be a Member of the Legislative Assembly (MLA) as Pierrette Ringuette, the Liberal who had defeated him in 1987, had been elected to the House of Commons of Canada and a by-election was being held to replace her.  Mockler was re-elected handily on November 29, 1993 and again in 1995, 1999, 2003 and 2006. In 2006, after the establishment of new electoral boundaries in New Brunswick, Mockler defeated soundly Liberal incumbent, Bert Paulin.

After the merger of the federal Progressive Conservative Party and the Canadian Alliance, Mockler was briefly mentioned as a possible leadership candidate for the new Conservative Party of Canada.  Mockler instead backed Belinda Stronach and served as co-chair of her campaign in New Brunswick and helped organize it in Quebec.

Mockler is a key organizer for the Progressive Conservative Party of New Brunswick.

Prime Minister Stephen Harper appointed Mockler as a Senator on January 2, 2009.

References 

1949 births
Living people
Université de Moncton alumni
Progressive Conservative Party of New Brunswick MLAs
Members of the Executive Council of New Brunswick
People from Madawaska County, New Brunswick
Conservative Party of Canada senators
Canadian senators from New Brunswick
21st-century Canadian politicians
School board members in Canada